Rudolf Vojta (15 April 1912 - 2 November 1984) was an Austrian ice hockey player who competed for the Austrian national team at the 1936 Winter Olympics in Garmisch-Partenkirchen.

Playing career
Vojta made 10 appearances for the Austrian national team at the World Ice Hockey Championships between 1938 and 1949. He also represented his country at the 1936 Winter Olympics.

He played club hockey for Wiener EV in the Austrian Hockey Championship.

References

1912 births
1984 deaths
Austrian ice hockey defencemen
Ice hockey people from Vienna
Ice hockey players at the 1936 Winter Olympics
Olympic ice hockey players of Austria
Wiener EV players